Liv Bliksrud (born 12 March 1945) is a Norwegian philologist.

She took the cand.philol. degree in 1973 and the dr.philos. degree in 1987. She is a professor at the Department of Literature, Area Studies and European Languages, University of Oslo. Among her literary interests are Nobel Prize laureate Sigrid Undset. She is a member of the Norwegian Academy of Science and Letters, the Royal Norwegian Society of Sciences and Letters and the Norwegian Academy for Language and Literature.

She resides in Fagerborg, Oslo.

References 

1945 births
Living people
Norwegian philologists
Women philologists
Academic staff of the University of Oslo
Members of the Norwegian Academy of Science and Letters
Royal Norwegian Society of Sciences and Letters
Members of the Norwegian Academy